Daniel Nestor and Nenad Zimonjić defeated Jonas Björkman and Kevin Ullyett in the final, 7–6(14–12), 6–7(3–7), 6–3, 6–3, to win the gentlemen's doubles title at the 2008 Wimbledon Championships. With the win, Nestor completed the career Grand Slam and the career Super Slam.

Arnaud Clément and Michaël Llodra were the reigning champions, but withdrew due to a left arm injury for Llodra.

Seeds

  Bob Bryan /  Mike Bryan (semifinals)
  Daniel Nestor /  Nenad Zimonjić (champions)
  Jonathan Erlich /  Andy Ram (quarterfinals)
  Mahesh Bhupathi /  Mark Knowles (first round)
  Simon Aspelin /  Julian Knowle (first round)
  Martin Damm /  Pavel Vízner (first round)
  Arnaud Clément /  Michaël Llodra (withdrew)
  Jonas Björkman /  Kevin Ullyett (final)
  Lukáš Dlouhý /  Leander Paes (semifinals)
  Mariusz Fyrstenberg /  Marcin Matkowski (first round)
  Jeff Coetzee /  Wesley Moodie (second round)
  Marcelo Melo  /  André Sá (third round, withdrew)
  František Čermák /  Jordan Kerr (third round)
  Max Mirnyi /  Jamie Murray (third round)
  Christopher Kas /  Rogier Wassen (third round)
  Julien Benneteau /  Nicolas Mahut (third round)

Arnaud Clément and Michaël Llodra withdrew due to a left arm injury for Llodra. They were replaced in the draw by lucky losers Hugo Armando and Jesse Levine.

Qualifying

Draw

Finals

Top half

Section 1

Section 2

Bottom half

Section 3

Section 4

References

External links

2008 Wimbledon Championships – Men's draws and results at the International Tennis Federation

Men's Doubles
Wimbledon Championship by year – Men's doubles